Olena Fedota (born 23 August 1986) is a Ukrainian épée and sabre wheelchair fencer. She won the silver medal in the women's sabre B event at the 2020 Summer Paralympics held in Tokyo, Japan.

She previously competed in swimming at the 2012 Summer Paralympics held in London, United Kingdom and at the 2016 Summer Paralympics held in Rio de Janeiro, Brazil.

References

External links
 

Living people
1986 births
Place of birth missing (living people)
Ukrainian female sabre fencers
Swimmers at the 2012 Summer Paralympics
Swimmers at the 2016 Summer Paralympics
Wheelchair fencers at the 2020 Summer Paralympics
Medalists at the 2020 Summer Paralympics
Paralympic silver medalists for Ukraine
Paralympic medalists in wheelchair fencing
Paralympic wheelchair fencers of Ukraine
Ukrainian female épée fencers
Paralympic swimmers of Ukraine
Ukrainian female butterfly swimmers
Ukrainian female freestyle swimmers
21st-century Ukrainian women